Nathdwara railway station is a railway station in Rajsamand district, Rajasthan. Its code is NDT. It serves Nathdwara town. The station consists of two platforms. Passenger, Express trains halt here.

Nathdwara is well known for Shrinathji Temple, Nathdwara.

Trains

The following trains start from Nathdwara railway station:

 Okha–Nathdwara Express

References

Railway stations in Rajsamand district
Ajmer railway division